Frederik (Freek) J. Beekman is a Dutch inventor, entrepreneur and Professor of Applied Physics at Delft University of Technology, known for his work in the field of molecular imaging.

Life and work 
Born in Markelo, Beekman studied Experimental Physics at Radboud University Nijmegen from 1986 to 1991. In 1992 he started his PhD at Utrecht University, graduating in 1995 with his thesis, entitled "Fully 3D reconstruction of SPECT using object shape-dependent scatter models."

From 1995 until 2008 he was appointed as a Physicist at the Image Sciences Institute and Department of Nuclear Medicine, University Medical Centre Utrecht, rising to the post of associate professor in 2002. In 2007 he has been appointed full professor of Applied Physics at Delft University of Technology where he heads the Radiation, Detection & Medical Imaging section. The main activities of this section involve research on radiation detection, molecular imaging and radiation therapy.

In 2006 he founded MILabs B.V., a molecular imaging spin-off from the University Medical Centre Utrecht, the Netherlands that utilises Beekman’s inventions on high-resolution PET and SPECT to produce high-resolution scanners for mice and men.

Selected awards 
In 2013, Beekman received the FOM Valorisation Award
In 2017 the Edward Hoffman Memorial Award from the Society of Nuclear Medicine and Molecular Imaging.
In both 2015 and 2018, Beekman and his team received the Commercial Innovation of the Year Award of the World Molecular Imaging Society.

References

External links 

Living people
Academic staff of the Delft University of Technology
Dutch physicists
Dutch inventors
Date of birth missing (living people)
Radboud University Nijmegen alumni
Utrecht University alumni
People from Hof van Twente
Year of birth missing (living people)